Miami Air Route Traffic Control Center (or Miami Center, ZMA) is one of 22 United States air route traffic control centers (ARTCs), or area control centers, located at 7500 N.W. 58th st, Miami-Dade County, Florida (Miami postal address).

Center
The primary responsibility of Miami Center is sequencing and separation of over-flights, arrivals, and departures in order to provide safe, orderly, and expeditious flow of aircraft filed under instrument flight rules (IFR).

Miami Center is the fifth-busiest ARTCC in the United States. Between January 1, 2017, and December 31, 2017, Miami Center handled 2,441,228 aircraft operations. Miami Center covers approximately 22.5 million cubic miles of the Southern United States, including parts of Florida, the Atlantic Ocean and the Gulf of Mexico.

Miami Center shares boundaries with Houston Air Route Traffic Control Center, Jacksonville Air Route Traffic Control Center, New York Air Route Traffic Control Center, San Juan Combined En-route Radar Approach Control (CERAP), Turks & Caicos, the Bahamas, the Dominican Republic, Haiti, and Cuba Area Control Centers. ZMA overlies or abuts several approach control facilities (including Miami, Palm Beach, Orlando, Fort Myers, and Tampa approaches).

References

External links
Miami Center Weather Service Unit (CWSU) (NWS/FAA)

Air traffic control centers
Air traffic control in the United States
Aviation in Florida